Ilie Damașcan is a Moldovan footballer who plays as a forward for FC Sfîntul Gheorghe.

Career
On 23 February 2019, Damașcan signed for FC Banants, being released by mutual consent on 1 June 2019.

Honours
Zimbru Chișinău
Moldovan Cup (1): 2013–14
Moldovan Super Cup (1): 2014

Notes

References

External links

1995 births
Living people
Moldovan footballers
Moldova youth international footballers
Moldova under-21 international footballers
Association football forwards
Moldovan Super Liga players
FC Zimbru Chișinău players
CS Petrocub Hîncești players
FC Sfîntul Gheorghe players
Armenian Premier League players
FC Urartu players
Liga II players
FCV Farul Constanța players
AFC Turris-Oltul Turnu Măgurele players
FC Unirea Constanța players
Moldovan expatriate footballers
Moldovan expatriate sportspeople in Armenia
Expatriate footballers in Armenia
Moldovan expatriate sportspeople in Romania
Expatriate footballers in Romania